Melanella conoidea is a species of sea snail, a marine gastropod mollusk in the family Eulimidae. The species is one of many species known to exist within the genus, Melanella.

Distribution

This species occurs in the following locations:

 Caribbean Sea
 Colombia
 Costa Rica
 Cuba
 Gulf of Mexico
 Lesser Antilles
 Mexico
 Puerto Rico
 Venezuela

Description 
The maximum recorded shell length is 12.7 mm.

Habitat 
Minimum recorded depth is 0 m. Maximum recorded depth is 538 m.

References

External links

conoidea
Gastropods described in 1851